Davilex Games B.V. was a video game developer and video game publisher, located in Houten, Utrecht, Netherlands. It was founded in 1986 as part of Davilex International, and is most well known for its Racer franchise, with the games London Racer and London Racer II selling over 600,000 copies in the UK. Autobahn Rasers sales in the German market totaled 103,000 units from January through September 1998, which made it the region's sixth-best-selling computer game during that period. In February 1999, Autobahn Rasers computer version received a "Gold" award from the Verband der Unterhaltungssoftware Deutschland (VUD), indicating sales of at least 100,000 units across Germany, Austria and Switzerland. Davilex closed the game division in 2005 because it was not profitable enough, and their games were generally not well received.

Games

Davilex Racer series 
 Autobahn Raser-series
 A2 Racer-series
 Europe Racer
 USA Racer
 Holiday Racer
 London Racer-series
 Grachten Racer

Other games
 AmsterDoom (Amsterdam Monster Madness)
 Knight Rider: The Game
 Knight Rider: The Game 2
 Casino Tycoon
 SAS Anti-terror Force
 GIGN Anti-terror Force
 Invasion Deutschland
 Red Baron
 Miami Vice
 Police Chase
 Amsterdam Taxi Madness
 112 Reddingshelikopter (112 Rescue helicopter)
 RedCat series
 Beach King Stunt Racer
 K 2000: The Game
 Inspecteur Banaan en de ontvoering van Mabella (Inspector Banana and the kidnapping of Mabella)

References

External links
 

Defunct video game companies of the Netherlands
Video game companies established in 1986
Video game companies disestablished in 2005
Companies based in Utrecht (province)
Houten